Dushanbe International School (DIS) is an international school located in Dushanbe, Tajikistan. DIS offers Cambridge International Examinations in addition to local examinations.

Lessons are taught in English. Tajik and Russian are the compulsory second languages.

Academics

 DIS is a regular member of the European Council of International Schools.(www.ecis.org)
 DIS is a regular member of the Council of International Schools.(www.cois.org)
 DIS is ETS certified test center for internet based TOEFL.(www.ets.org/toefl)
 DIS is a centre of Cambridge International Examinations.(www.cie.org.uk)
 DIS uses Cambridge International Primary Programme in Grades 1-5.
 DIS uses Cambridge Checkpoints in Grades 6-7.
 DIS uses Cambridge IGCSE in Grades 8-9.
 DIS will start using Cambridge AS level in Grade 10-11.

School Sections
DIS is divided into three sections: Kindergarten, Primary School and Secondary School. There are 11 grade levels in Dushanbe International School.

Facilities
DIS offers various physical activities, including group sports, volleyball, basketball, football (soccer) and table tennis. Picnics and field trips are frequently arranged in our school. There are clubs for Science, Maths, English, Computer Studies, Soccer, Table Tennis, Basketball, Volleyball, Music, Journalism and Chess.

There is a computer laboratory and a collection of educational and recreational CD-ROMs. There is 12-hour Internet capacity in school and through the network most of the staff have access to the Internet. The students also have access to Internet during IT lessons, after the lessons and at the weekends. School's library is one of the best, possessing around 8000 books, most of which are available for student's use.

History
Dushanbe International School (DIS) was founded in 1997 to serve the international community in Dushanbe  and the surrounding area. It now houses students in grades Year 1 to Year 11 and Kindergarten. Students are drawn from families working for both the international and local business communities, including the diplomatic corps and various multi-national government-funded organizations.

References

External links

Education in Dushanbe
Educational institutions established in 1997
Schools in Tajikistan
Cambridge schools in Tajikistan
1997 establishments in Tajikistan